Megan Knowles-Bacon, best known by her stage name Megan Swann, is the president of The Magic Circle, a British magicians' organization. She was 28 when she gained the position in 2021. Until 1991 the Magic Circle did not admit women at all.

Background 
Swann has been performing magic since she was a child. Her career began via the Young Magician's Club, a youth initiative of The Magic Circle. She became a member of The Magic Circle at 18. In 2014, she became the first woman to be elected as an officer of the society (she was elected as secretary), and she was elected as its Vice-President in 2019.

Swann is passionate about nature, so uses her magic performance skills to promote environmental issues. She  performs and tours the UK with her ‘Green Magic Show’ for children. She has a degree in Wildlife Conservation from University of Kent in Canterbury  and performs 'environmental magic'  which she describes as  'a powerful tool for sharing important messages in a fun and engaging way'.

References 

Living people
Female magicians
British magicians
British performance artists
Year of birth missing (living people)
Alumni of the University of Kent